Demarchos or Demarchus has historically been a Greek civic office.

It can also refer to people of that name. These include:
 In Greek mythology, a son of Aegyptus, murdered by Eubule, one of the Danaïdes.
 An epic poet in an inscription in Ptolemais
 Demarchos, the son of Taron, a Lycian honoured by the Samians for his intercession on their behalf with Demetrios Poliorketes
 Demarchos, the son of Epidokos, a Syracusan general and opponent of the tyrant Dionysius I
 Satrap of Hellespontine Phrygia under Alexander the Great, successor of Calas

References